A concert T-shirt is a T-shirt that is associated with a concert or a concert tour, often for a rock or metal band. Bands and musical groups often promote themselves by creating and selling or giving away T-shirts at their shows, tours, and events. A concert T-shirt typically contains silk screened graphics of the name, logo, or image of a musical performer or group. One popular choice of graphics on the rear of the T-shirts is a listing of information about the band's current tour, including tour cities (sometimes specifying venues) and corresponding dates. In the 1960s, printed T-shirts gained popularity for self-expression as well for advertisements, protests, and souvenirs. In 1968, rock producer Bill Graham co-founded Winterland Productions, credited as "the first concert T-shirt manufacturing company".

One of the most popular colors for concert T-shirts is a flat black. Fans often purchase or obtain these shirts to wear to future concerts.

Wearing a concert T-shirt is a cultural signifier, with commentators identifying various reasons behind the choice to wear a particular one. For example, attending a band's concert while wearing a T-shirt from one of the band's tours long ago can give the wearer a certain prestige amongst other fans, it being indicative of the longevity of their support for the group.

Screen printing

Screen printing or silk screening is the method of printing designs on T-shirts. The process begins by stretching a fine mesh around a rigid frame. Afterwards, a template is attached to the screen. The template covers the portions not to be printed. The completed screen is placed over a T-shirt, and ink is then pressed through the screen, leaving a print. Multiple templates can be used on the same shirt to create a multicolored screen print. Screen printing is one of the most commonly used techniques for putting a design on a T-shirt.

See also
Heavy metal fashion
Punk fashion
Grunge

References

Rock music
Heavy metal fashion
Concert tours
T-shirts